The 1926 North Carolina Tar Heels football team represented the University of North Carolina in the 1926 college football season.

Schedule

References

North Carolina
North Carolina Tar Heels football seasons
North Carolina Tar Heels football